The Chinese American Museum DC (abbreviated CAMDC) is a cultural museum in Downtown Washington, DC established through the efforts of The Chinese American Museum Foundation, private benefactors, and the general public. The museum focuses on the history of Chinese in America with an emphasis on the Chinese Exclusion Act of 1882, racial and social issues, cultural topics, and the achievements of past and contemporary Chinese Americans. The project began in late 2017, first with the bequest of a 1907 historic, 5-story building in the Embassy Row section of Washington four blocks north of the White House. On November 9, 2018, the project was first announced at an event at the Willard Hotel to a group of 160 people from museum, historian, and Asian American and community leadership. The museum had been open to visitors during its development and has recently reopened to the public after pandemic restrictions.

Programs and exhibits
In October of 2019, the museum completed the first phase of permanent exhibits for its reception lobby and first floor including a digital photo-wall featuring personal stories and images of "everyday" Chinese Americans as well as an interactive digital timeline highlighting historical dates, figures, and pivotal moments in Chinese American history. The museum also hosted two conferences and corresponding special, temporary exhibits including Chinese American Women in History and Safe Harbor: Shanghai, a lecture and exhibit on Jewish refugees that sought shelter in World War II Shanghai and later immigrated to the United States.

In March of 2021, the museum held a virtual gala, "Build it together!" hosted by television journalists Joie Chen and Richard Lui. Honorees included Ambassador Julia Chang Bloch, television journalist Connie Chung, astronaut Taylor Wang, advocate and CEO of TIME'S UP Now, Tina Tchen, the inventor of the N95 mask technology, Dr. Peter Tsai, screenwriter Adele Lim (Crazy Rich Asians and Raya and the Last Dragon), and Daphne Kwok, VP of Asian American and Pacific Islander Audience Strategy at AARP. Entertainment was provided by America's Got Talent winner, magician Shin Lim, a cappella group, Ethnobeat, contemporary and traditional artists, including a classical guzheng player, and opera singer Huanhuan Ma.

Currently, the museum is developing permanent exhibits that are divided into thematic sections: Identity and Diversity, Gold Mountain (California Gold Rush), Building America (railroads and early industry and commerce), Exclusion and the Fight for Equality, Chinese American Communities, Service to Country (military, civil, diplomatic, and uniformed service), and individual exhibits highlighting contemporary Chinese American figures and accomplishments.

Recent special exhibits include "Dora Fugh Lee: A Lifetime of Art," a retrospective of the Washingtonian artist, "Golden Threads: Chinese Opera in America," "Wild Cranes" a visual poetry and calligraphy exhibit. , Enchanting Stitches and Stories: Embroidery, and China from China: Porcelain & Stories of Early American Trade.

References

External links

Chinese-American museums
History museums in Washington, D.C.
Downtown (Washington, D.C.)
Ethnic museums in Washington, D.C.